Sadguru Swamy Nithyananda Institute of Technology is an engineering college situated at Kanhangad in Kasaragod District, India.

History
It got affiliation with the Kannur University in 2010.

Courses offered
 B.Tech. Civil Engineering
 B.Tech. Mechanical Engineering
 B.Tech. Electronics & Communication

References

Colleges affiliated to Kannur University
Colleges in Kasaragod district
Engineering colleges in Kerala